Seymour Legrand "Sy" Cromwell II (February 17, 1934 – May 2, 1977) was an American rower. He won a silver medal in the double sculls event at the 1964 Summer Olympics and at the 1966 World Rowing Championships.

Private life
Cromwell was born in New York City in 1934.  His paternal grandfather, and namesake, was Seymour L. Cromwell, a former president of the New York Stock Exchange. After graduating from Princeton University in 1956, he studied at MIT and Harvard University. He then briefly worked as a naval architect, but then changed to teaching.

Rowing
During his rowing career, Cromwell won seven national titles in the single sculls and several more in double sculls. He won the Diamond Challenge Sculls at the Henley Royal Regatta in 1964, rowing for the Nonpareil Rowing Club of New York. He competed at the 1961 European Rowing Championships in single sculls and won bronze. Although he was selected only for the 1964 Olympics, he continued to be a top US rower up to 1970s, finishing third at the 1976 Olympic trials. In 1963, he won a gold medal at the Pan American Games in single sculls.

Death and family
He died of pancreatic cancer on May 2, 1977 in Cambridge, Massachusetts.  He is survived by his wife, Gail Pierson Cromwell, originally of Natchitoches, Louisiana, and his daughter, Abigail W. S. Cromwell, of Cambridge, MA, who was born after he died.

References

External links
 

1934 births
1977 deaths
Rowers at the 1964 Summer Olympics
Olympic silver medalists for the United States in rowing
American male rowers
World Rowing Championships medalists for the United States
Medalists at the 1964 Summer Olympics
Pan American Games medalists in rowing
Pan American Games gold medalists for the United States
Rowers at the 1963 Pan American Games
European Rowing Championships medalists
Medalists at the 1963 Pan American Games
Deaths from pancreatic cancer
Deaths from cancer in Massachusetts